Viktor Ivanov (8 October 1956 – 23 November 2007) was a Ukrainian boxer. He competed for the Soviet Union in the men's heavyweight event at the 1976 Summer Olympics. At the 1976 Summer Olympics, he defeated Jürgen Fanghänel of East Germany, before losing to Atanas Sapundzhiev of Bulgaria.

References

1956 births
2007 deaths
Ukrainian male boxers
Olympic boxers of the Soviet Union
Boxers at the 1976 Summer Olympics
Sportspeople from Donetsk
Heavyweight boxers